X Factor Malta is the Maltese version of the British television music competition The X Factor, created by Simon Cowell. The first season premiered on 7 October 2018 and has since been broadcast on Television Malta. In July 2020, it was announced that the show would be replaced by Malta's Got Talent, but after a one-year hiatus, a third season began in October 2021.

Season summary
To date, three seasons have been broadcast, as summarised below.

 Contestant in "Ray Mercieca"
 Contestant in "Alexandra Alden"
 Contestant in "Howard Keith Debono"
 Contestant in "Ira Losco"
 Contestant in "Ivan Grech"
 Contestant in "Philippa Naudi"

Judges' categories and their contestants
In each season, each judge is allocated a category to mentor and chooses three acts to progress to the live finals. This table shows, for each series, which category each judge was allocated and which acts he or she put through to the live finals.

Key:
 – Winning judge/category. Winners are in bold, eliminated contestants in small font.

Presenter and judges
On 2 July 2018, it was announced that Ben Camille was selected to host the show.

The full judges' panel was revealed on the 31 July 2018, and was composed of music producer Howard Keith Debono, The Rifffs' frontman Ray Mercieca, Maltese singer and songwriter Alexandra Alden, and singer/star Ira Losco. 
The senior producers are Gordon Bonello and Olwyn Jo Saliba.

Season 1

Pre-auditions 

The first appeal for applicants was made on 26 June 2018, with the launch of the online submission form. Auditioning artists were also able to send a video audition via the Whatsapp messaging platform. In addition, a number of pop-up booths were set up around Malta in early July to encourage people to enter.

Producers auditions were held from 13 to 15 July at Fort St Elmo. There the show's producers assessed the auditioning acts and determined who would progress to the judges auditions.

Judges' auditions

The auditionees chosen by the producers were invited back to the last set of auditions that took place in front of the judges. These auditions were filmed at Fort St Angelo from 1 to 8 August and broadcast from 7 October, as well as short daily extra auditions on the X Factor Malta YouTube channel and on the Facebook page of Vodafone Malta.

The 120 successful contestants then progressed to the bootcamp round.

Bootcamp 

The bootcamp round was filmed at the Hilton Malta Conference Centre from 9 to 12 September and broadcast on 11 and 18 November.

Contestants were given three performance challenges. On the first day, the 120 contestants were split into the four category groups - Boys, Girls, Overs and Groups. Acts in each category were given one song to sing a cappella: "A Million Reasons" (Girls), "See You Again" (Boys), "Don’t Let the Sun Go Down On Me" (Overs) "My Girl" (Groups). After the performances, the judges sent home 30 acts.

For the second challenge, the remaining acts each selected a song from the Wall of Songs, which they had to perform with three others who had selected the same song. Contestants were either put through to the next stage, or went to the Waiting Room, where they later had the possibility of being called on to be part of a newly formed group.

In the final challenge, the remaining acts - including newly formed groups - performed a song of their own choice. The jury then selected 12 participants from each category to go through to the Six Chair Challenge.

Six Chair Challenge 

The Six Chair Challenge was filmed at the Malta Fairs & Conventions Centre (MFCC) in Attard on 11 and 12 October 2018.

The 24 successful acts were:
Boys: Mark Anthony Bartolo, Norbert Bondin, Aidan Cassar, Luke Chappell, Owen Leuellen, Claudio Zammit
Girls: Kelsey Bellante, Karin Duff, Nicole Frendo, Danica Muscat, Michela Pace, Jade Vella
Overs: Anna Azzopardi, Franklin Calleja, Anna Faniello, Petra, Ben Purplle, Vanessa Lee Sultana
Groups: 4th Line, Horizon, Kayati, Prism, Systm12, Xtreme

Judges' Houses

The Judges' Houses episodes were broadcast on 23 and 30 December 2018.

Contestants
Key:
 – Winner
 – Runner-up
 – Third Place

Live shows 
The live shows began on Sunday, 6 January 2019. They were filmed at the Malta Fairs & Conventions Centre (MFCC) in Attard, Malta. Dance groups contracted for all live shows were The Unit Collective (Deedee Clark, Kimberly Lowell, Nicole Schembri), Southville Dancers (Christian Scerri), Kinetic Dance Academy (Clayton Mifsud, Daphne Gatt) and Annalise Dance Studio (Annalise Ellul).

Results summary
Colour key
  – Contestant in the bottom two/three and had to perform in the Sing-Off
  – Contestant was in the bottom three but received the fewest votes and was immediately eliminated
  – Contestant received the fewest public votes and was immediately eliminated (no final showdown)

Live show details

Week 1 (6 Jan) 
 Theme: This is Me

 Judges' vote to eliminate
 Mercieca: Xtreme
 Alden: Franklin Calleja
 Losco: Franklin Calleja
 Debono: Franklin Calleja

Week 2 (13 Jan) 
 Theme: Throwbacks

 Judges' vote to eliminate
 Mercieca: 4th Line
 Alden: Ben Purplle
 Losco: 4th Line
 Debono: Ben Purplle

With the acts in the sing-off receiving two votes each, the result went to deadlock and reverted to the earlier public vote. 4th Line was eliminated as the act with the fewest public votes.

Week 3: Semi-Final (20 Jan) 
 Theme: Movie Spectacular, Jukebox

 Judges' vote to eliminate
 Mercieca: Luke Chappell
 Alden: Owen Leuellen
 Debono: Owen Leuellen
 Losco: Luke Chappell

With the acts in the sing-off receiving two votes each, the result went to deadlock and reverted to the earlier public vote. Luke Chappell was eliminated as the act with the fewest public votes.

In this semi-final, the eight qualified finalists performed at least once. The two acts with the fewest public votes after the first round left the competition, with Kelsey Bellante, gaining the fewest votes overall, and Ben Purplle gaining the second fewest votes. The top six performed again, with the top three acts automatically progressing to the final. The remaining three faced elimination. Of these three, Norbert Bondin received the fewest votes and was thus immediately eliminated. The remaining two, Owen Leuellen and Luke Chappell, faced the tiebreaker, which was to be decided by the judges. However, as the tie was not resolved by the end of the judges' vote, the deadlock - once again decided by the public vote - had to be used. As Owen Leuellen received more votes then Luke Chappell, the former progressed to the final.

Week 4: Final (26 Jan)

Aired Shows

Season 2
The second season premiered on 6 October 2019. As with the inaugural season, the format continued to serve as the Maltese national selection for the Eurovision Song Contest. The winner of the second season of X Factor Malta would have represented the island nation at the 2020 contest in Rotterdam, Netherlands, but the contest was cancelled due to COVID-19.

Pre-auditions

Judges' auditions

Bootcamp

Six Chair Challenge 

The 24 successful acts were:
Boys: Matt Blxck, Kyle Cutajar, Dav. Jr, Giovanni, Karl Schembri, Jurgen Volkov
Girls: Jasmine Abela, Gail Attard, Marija Bellia, Destiny Chukunyere, Karin Duff, Justine Shorfid
Overs: Ed Abdilla, Celine Agius, Paul Anthony, Chantal Catania, Kersten Graham, Jozi
Groups: Bloodline, Chord, F.A.I.T.H, Reign, Sweet Chaos, Yazmin and James

Judges' Houses

The Judges' Houses episodes were broadcast on 22 and 29 December 2019.

Contestants
Key:
 – Winner
 – Runner-up
 – Third Place

Live shows 
The live shows began on Sunday, 12 January 2020. They were filmed at the Malta Fairs & Conventions Centre (MFCC) in Attard, Malta. Dance groups contracted for all live shows were The Unit Collective (Deedee Clark, Kimberly Lowell, Nicole Schembri), Southville Dancers (Christian Scerri), Kinetic Dance Academy (Clayton Mifsud, Daphne Gatt) and Annalise Dance Studio (Annalise Ellul).

Results summary
Colour key
  – Contestant in the bottom two/three and had to perform in the Sing-Off
  – Contestant was in the bottom three but received the fewest votes and was immediately eliminated
  – Contestant received the fewest votes and was immediately eliminated

Live show details

Week 1 (12 Jan) 
 Theme: Born This Way

 Judges' vote to eliminate
 Alden: Paul Anthony
 Debono: Paul Anthony
 Mercieca: Paul Anthony
 Losco: Paul Anthony

Week 2 (19 Jan) 
 Theme: Guilty Pleasures

 Judges' vote to eliminate
 Mercieca: Yazmin & James
 Debono: Dav. Jr
 Alden: Yazmin & James
 Losco: Dav. Jr

With the acts in the sing-off receiving two votes each, the result went to deadlock and reverted to the earlier public vote. Dav. Jr was eliminated as the act with the fewest public votes

Week 3 (26 Jan) 
 Theme: Movie Spectacular

 Judges' vote to eliminate
 Debono: Celine Agius
 Alden: Bloodline
 Losco: Celine Agius
 Mercieca: Celine Agius

Week 4 Semi-final (2 Feb) 
 Theme: Big Band, Jukebox

Week 5: Final (8 Feb)

Season 3 
The third season premiered on 3 October 2021. This time around, the winner will not receive the rights to represent Malta at the Eurovision Song Contest 2022 in Italy.

Pre-auditions

Judges' auditions

Bootcamp

Six Chair Challenge 

The 24 successful acts were:
Boys: Aidan Drakard, Ryan Hili, Kevin Paul, Nathan Psaila, Rheez, Isaac Tom
Girls: Timea Farr, Lisa Gauci, Mariah Gerada, Kristy Spiteri, Hannah Theuma, Shauna Vassallo
Overs: Janice Azzopardi, Cheryl Balzan, Dean Barton, Audrienne Fenech, Jastene Pacis, Jimmy Tyrrell
Groups: Beyond, Ceci & Kriss, Daryl & Dale, Jasmine, Anna & Jana, Soul Tide, Wish Me Lack

Judges' Houses

The Judges' Houses episodes were broadcast on 19 December 2021 and 2 January 2022.

Finalists
Key:
 – Winner
 – Runner-up
 – Third Place

Live shows 
The live shows began on Sunday, 16 January 2022. They were filmed at the Malta Fairs & Conventions Centre (MFCC) in Attard, Malta. Dance groups contracted for all live shows were The Unit Collective (Deedee Clark, Kimberly Lowell, Nicole Schembri), Southville Dancers (Christian Scerri), Kinetic Dance Academy (Clayton Mifsud, Daphne Gatt) and Annalise Dance Studio (Annalise Ellul).

Results summary
Colour key
  – Contestant in the bottom two/three and had to perform in the Sing-Off
  – Contestant was in the bottom three but received the fewest votes and was immediately eliminated
  – Contestant received the fewest votes and was immediately eliminated

Live show details

Week 1 (16 Jan) 
 Theme: It's My Life
 Group performance: "It's My Life"

 Judges' vote to eliminate
 Losco: Beyond
 Naudi: Jimmy Tyrrell
 Debono: Beyond
 Grech: Jimmy Tyrrell

With the acts in the sing-off receiving two votes each, the result went to deadlock and reverted to the earlier public vote. Jimmy Tyrrell was eliminated as the act with the fewest public votes

Week 2 (23 Jan) 
 Theme: Retro

 Judges' vote to eliminate
 Naudi: Timea Farr
 Grech: Soul Tide
 Losco: Soul Tide
 Debono: Soul Tide

Week 3 (30 Jan) 
 Theme: Soundtracks

 Judges' vote to eliminate
 Debono: Timea Farr
 Grech: Kevin Paul
 Naudi: Kevin Paul
 Losco: Kevin Paul

Week 4 (6 Feb) 
 Theme: Greatest hits

Week 5: Final (12 Feb)

References

External links

Watch On Demand

The X Factor
Maltese television shows
Non-British television series based on British television series
Malta in the Eurovision Song Contest
Eurovision Song Contest selection events